My Darling Aswang is a situational comedy aired every Sunday nights on TV5 from April 4, 2010 to May 8, 2011, replacing Shall We Dance?. Inspired by the movie Ang Darling Kong Aswang.

About
The sitcom My Darling Aswang is a spin-off from the MMFF 2009 box office movie Ang Darling Kong Aswang. It was Vic Sotto's second program with TV5 after Who Wants to be a Millionaire.

Cast
 Vic Sotto as Victor
 Daiana Menezes as Bella
 Tetchie Agbayani as Tasha
 Miguel Faustmann as Demet
 Ces Quesada as Aling Idang
 Sugar Mercado as Sugar
 Jose Manalo as Gas
 Wally Bayola as Bal
 Richie D'Horsie as Mel
 Kakai Bautista as Queyni
 Rhea Nakpil as Dindin

See also
 List of programs broadcast by TV5 (Philippine TV network)

Philippine television sketch shows
TV5 (Philippine TV network) original programming
2010 Philippine television series debuts
2011 Philippine television series endings
Philippine comedy television series
Filipino-language television shows
Live action television shows based on films